Danger Mouse is a British animated television series produced by Cosgrove Hall Films for Thames Television. It features the eponymous Danger Mouse who worked as a secret agent and is a parody of British spy fiction, particularly the Danger Man series and James Bond. It originally ran from 28 September 1981 to 19 March 1992 on the ITV network.

The series spawned a spin-off show, Count Duckula, which aired between 1988 and 1993, and an updated series, under the same name, began airing in September 2015 on CBBC.

Characters

Main

 Danger Mouse (voiced by David Jason) is often called the world's greatest secret agent—so secret, in fact, that his codename has a codename. His catchphrases include "Good grief" when he becomes upset or shocked, "Penfold, shush" when his assistant makes a foolish remark.  He was originally going to be brown; however, the creators thought that he and Penfold needed to be different colours.
 Brian Cosgrove described Jason's portrayal as "His voice had the perfect mix of forcefulness, humour and gentleness. He was totally committed to doing voiceovers for silly cartoons, which warmed my heart, and we became great friends."  Jason said "I wanted to make him sound believable. We decided he would be softly spoken, very British, very heroic, but also a bit of a coward. He’d save the world, but he’d also run for it!"
 Ernest Penfold (voiced by Terry Scott) is a timid, bespectacled hamster, and Danger Mouse's reluctant assistant and sidekick. He is often mistaken for a mole; however, Brian Cosgrove has stated Penfold is supposed to be a hamster. Penfold stands just over half the height of Danger Mouse, and always wears thick round glasses and a crumpled blue suit with a white shirt and a yellow and black striped tie. In the first episode, he is codenamed the Jigsaw "because when he is faced with a problem, he goes to pieces."
 Brian Cosgrove came up with Penfold's character design when he was waiting for a meeting with Thames Television, and had drawn up "this little fellow with heavy glasses and a baggy suit" and then realized he had drawn his brother Denis, who worked for the Sunday Express and "who was bald with heavy black glasses".
 Colonel K (voiced by Edward Kelsey): Danger Mouse's boss; often mistaken for a walrus, it was revealed in an issue of Look-in magazine that he is, in fact, a chinchilla. During the last two seasons, he became more absent-minded, tending to frustrate both DM and Penfold with his tendency to ramble nonsense. A running gag in the later seasons is that he botches the usage of the phrase "over and out" multiple times.
 Baron Silas Greenback (voiced by Edward Kelsey): The recurring villain and Danger Mouse's archenemy; a toad with a wheezy voice, although, sometimes, he was referred to as a frog. Known as Baron Greenteeth in the unbroadcast pilot episode. Commonly known as the "Terrible Toad". In America, "greenback" is slang for dollar bill in many regions, adding to the sense of his commercial greed. Allegedly, he turned to a life of crime as a schoolboy when other children stole his bicycle and let all the air out of its tyres.
 Stiletto (voiced by Brian Trueman): Greenback's henchman; a crow. He always called Greenback "Barone", Italian for "Baron". In the original British version, he speaks with an Italian accent; this was changed to a Cockney accent for the U.S. distribution to avoid offending Italian-Americans. His last name is Mafiosa. In series 5, he is more incompetent and klutzy that Greenback usually has to whack him with his walking stick, and in series 9, Greenback uses a "hit box" that whacks Stiletto on the head with a mallet. 
 Nero (sounds provided by David Jason): Greenback's pet. A fluffy white caterpillar (equivalent to the stereotypical white cat frequently associated with arch villains, particularly Ernst Stavro Blofeld). He is a non-speaking character, although his noises and laugh are supplied by David Jason's voice sped up. Readily understood by Greenback and, less frequently, by Stiletto. He does not have any superpowers, except In the season 5 episode "Nero Power", where he temporarily exhibits the ability of telekinesis. In the special features of Danger Mouse cartoons, audiences were informed that Nero is actually the mastermind of Greenback's schemes.
  The Narrator (voiced by David Jason): The unseen narrator, who occasionally interacts with the characters, sometimes to the point of halting the plot for one reason or another. In a series 6 episode, he accidentally sends Danger Mouse and Penfold back in time with his broken mike. He often voices his disdain for the show and his job towards the end of the episode and through part of the closing credits. His name is Isambard Sinclair.

Supporting
 Professor Heinrich Von Squawkencluck   is an inventor mole, first appearing in the series where he was engaged in hormone experiments to grow chickens to enormous sizes. He invented the Mark III, Danger Mouse's flying car, and the Space Hopper, his personal spacecraft. He speaks in a broken German accent. Penfold is naturally leery of the professor, as he often winds up on the wrong side of his experiments.
 Flying Officer Buggles Pigeon: Another of Colonel K's agents who came to the aid of Danger Mouse and Penfold in the episode, "Chicken Run," and appeared in several episodes afterward. 
 Agent 57: A master of disguise, appearing initially as an earthworm. Agent 57 has disguised himself so often that he forgot his original appearance. In the series 6 episode, "The Spy Who Stayed In with a Cold", he gained the ability to change shape to resemble any character or animal whenever he sneezed, but when he shows Danger Mouse his original form, Danger Mouse is horrified.
 Leatherhead : Greenback's other crow henchman. Even less intelligent than Stiletto, he appeared in several of the early episodes, where he spent most of his time reading comic books.
 Count Duckula (voiced by David Jason): A fame-obsessed vampire duck who wants to appear in television. However, his utter lack of anything approaching talent makes his attempts to "entertain" rather terrifying (he has been known to use his "act" as a torture device). This resulted in a spin-off series, titled Count Duckula, starring the Count himself. The two versions of the character differ, however; the character featured in Danger Mouse is not a vegetarian, makes far greater use of his vampiric magic, and has an accent consisting of a lisp and a stutter, as well as occasional stuttering and duck-like squawks and quacks.
 J. J. Quark: a space alien who recurs in series 6. He claims possession of Earth based on a cosmic charter granted to his great-great-great-great grandfather. He has a robot assistant named Grovell, who always grovels whenever his name is mentioned.
 Doctor Augustus P. Crumhorn III (voiced by Jimmy Hibbert): A mad scientist wolf, he recurred as Danger Mouse's adversary starting in series 9. In the episode, "Penfold Transformed", he lists his full name as "Aloisius Julian Philibert Elphinstone Eugene Dionysis Barry Manilow Crumhorn", omitting both Augustus and the III. He and Greenback were at odds; once Crumhorn kidnapped Penfold and Penfold managed to escape simply because the two villains were too busy quarreling to notice his absence.

Production

Development
The show was created by Mark Hall and Brian Cosgrove for their production company, Cosgrove Hall Films. Danger Mouse was based on Patrick McGoohan's lead role in Danger Man. The show was intended to have a more serious tone as seen in the pilot episode but Mike Harding (who wrote the music for the show) gave Brian Cosgrove and Mark Hall the idea to make the series silly. "The characters had got stuck in reality and were doing James Bond type things rooted in the solid real world," said Harding, "I argued that once you invented a Mouse Secret Agent then all of creation and a good chunk of not creation was his oyster. In other words we could be as barmy (crazy) as we wanted." In an interview with The Guardian, Cosgrove said "We reckoned a secret service mouse foiling the plans of an evil toad – Baron Silas Greenback – was suitably ridiculous."

Cosgrove and Hall brought in Brian Trueman, who was working as an announcer on Granada TV, as the main writer.  For the voice of Danger Mouse, they picked David Jason after they saw him in the show Only Fools and Horses.  For the voice of Penfold, they picked Terry Scott, who was known for the show Terry and June

On 4 June 1984, the show was (along with Belle and Sebastian) the first animated show to appear on Nickelodeon in the United States and quickly became the second most popular show on the channel after You Can’t Do That on Television, as it appealed to both tweens and adults with its quick-witted English humour. It was often compared to American audiences as a British equivalent of The Rocky and Bullwinkle Show, due to its gentle satire of politics and outrageous plots.

It returned to terrestrial television after the BBC purchased episodes of it to broadcast in its daytime schedules with its first broadcast on 12 February 2007.

The show was expensive to make, sometimes needing 2,000 drawings thus footage was reused while certain scenes were set in the North Pole or "in the dark" (i.e. black with eyeballs visible only, or, in Danger Mouse's case, simply one eyeball) as a cost-cutting measure. This time-and-money saving device was cheerfully admitted by both Brian Cosgrove, who conceived the character and the show, and Brian Trueman, who wrote almost all the scripts from the beginning.

Reception
It has been widely claimed that in the show's viewing figures hit an all-time high of 21 million viewers in 1983. This figure is disputed, as the most viewed programme of the year, Coronation Street, only achieved 18.45 million viewers. The figure of 21 million appears to be the aggregate of viewing figures for five Danger Mouse episodes broadcast between 3-7 January 1983 (20.875 million in total, an average of 4.175 million per episode). For the week ending 9 January 1983, the rating figures of Danger Mouse did not place it within the top 10 ITV programmes.

In the UK, Channel 4's 100 Greatest Kids' TV Shows, the show came third, beaten only by The Muppet Show and The Simpsons.

It was named the 62nd best animated series by IGN, calling it one of the first British cartoons to become popular with American audiences.

Awards and nominations 
Danger Mouse was nominated for 11 BAFTA awards during its original run, but did not win any.

BAFTA Films 
A listing of British Academy Film Awards.

|-
| 1984 (37th)
| Danger Mouse series 4
| Best Short Animation
| 
|-
| 1985 (38th)
| Danger Mouse series 5
| Best Short Animation
| 
|-
| 1986 (39th)
| Danger Mouse series 6
| Best Short Animation
| 
|-
| 1987 (40th)
| Danger Mouse series 7
| Best Short Animation Film
| 
|-
|}

BAFTA TV 
A listing of British Academy Television Awards.

|-
| 1983
| Danger Mouse series 2 or 3
| Children's Programme - Entertainment / Drama
| 
|-
| 1984
| Danger Mouse series 4
| Children's Programme - Entertainment / Drama
| 
|-
| 1984
| Danger Mouse series 4
| Short Animation
| 
|-
| 1985
| Danger Mouse series 5
| Short Animation
| 
|-
| 1986
| Danger Mouse series 6
| Children's Programme - Entertainment / Drama
| 
|-
| 1986
| Danger Mouse series 6
| Short Animation
| 
|-
| 1987
| Danger Mouse series 7
| Short Animation
| 
|-
|}

Other awards 
In 2012, Brian Cosgrove received a Special Award from the British Academy Children's Awards.

In other media

Comics
A long-running comic strip adaptation, written by Angus P. Allan and illustrated by Arthur Ranson, ran in Look-in magazine and was syndicated in various other magazines. Ranson also provided some backdrops for the show. Allan and Ranson's work was highly appreciated by Cosgrove Hall, and the pair were awarded an "Oh Goodness!, Oh Crikey!" award in appreciation of their services. Some of Allan's stories were adapted for the show, although Allan's name was misspelled "Angus Allen". Artist Ranson later went on to illustrate Judge Anderson in the UK comic 2000 AD.

Video games
A series of video games based on the character also appeared. The first were Danger Mouse in Double Trouble and Danger Mouse in the Black Forest Chateau (both in 1984) followed by Danger Mouse in Making Whoopee! in 1985.

Two mobile games were published by ZED Worldwide;  Danger Mouse: Quiz in 2010 and Danger Mouse in 2011.

Audiobooks
Some stories were also available as read-along cassettes with accompanying books. They were re-read by the cast for audio.

Merchandise
During its run, the show spawned a wide range of merchandise, including storybooks, hardback annuals, jigsaw puzzles, a Panini sticker album, View-Master reels, and of course, VHS releases. In the years since, products have continued to sell, often aimed at the now-adult audience which grew up with it, such as T-shirts, mugs, key rings, fridge magnets and posters. To coincide with the 25th anniversary, Cosgrove Hall also licensed rights to a number of companies to produce a range of new anniversary merchandise including Blues Clothing (women's and girls' underwear and sleepwear) and Concept 2 Creation (collectible figurines).

FremantleMedia launched a webshop run by Metrostar e-commerce where a wide variety of goods were for sale, including the CD Audio adaptation of two of the show's episodes using the original artists voices, released by Steve Deakin-Davies: The Ambition Company.

Other appearances 
 American musician & producer Danger Mouse chose his stage name as a reference the show, initially performing in a mouse costume.
 In the 1989 film The BFG, which was also produced by Cosgrove-Hall, a Danger Mouse poster is shown above a boy's bed.
 Victor and Hugo (1991): Appeared as themselves in the episode titled "French Exchange" S2E7.
 South Park (2008): In the video, Danger Mouse is in Imaginationland.

Episodes

Home media

Broadcast history

The series was transmitted on ITV via the CITV brand from 1981 to 1992.  The show has the initials 'DM' prominently emblazoned on his chest. This causes problems for those translating it into other languages, where a literal translation of the words 'Danger' and 'Mouse' do not have those initials; the Scots Gaelic version, for example, calls the show (and the lead) Donnie Murdo (two given names unconnected either with mice or danger). which was broadcast on STV – from 1990 to 1994 and again on BBC Alba in 2015.  The series has also been broadcast on numerous channels on Boomerang (2000–06) and BBC Two (2007–09)

He was Dzielna Mysz (brave mouse) in Polish, Dundermusen (Thundermouse) in Swedish, and Dare Dare Motus in French, "Dare Dare" being French slang for "as fast as possible". The Slovene translation omitted the DM initials entirely, however, dubbing Danger Mouse  ('Brave Mouse').

In Australia, the show was first broadcast on ABC TV in 1982 it then moved to Network Ten in 1996. It was also the first British cartoon to break into Cheez TV, being shown on the weekdays.

Revival 

It was reported in 2013 that the series was under consideration for a revival, and in June 2014 it was announced that a new series was being made for broadcast on CBBC in 2015. The new series is produced by Boulder Media for FremantleMedia Kids. It is directed by Robert Cullen with Brian Cosgrove, one of the original creators, acting as creative consultant. Alexander Armstrong and actor Kevin Eldon voice Danger Mouse and Penfold, respectively; Dave Lamb takes the role of the narrator, whilst Stephen Fry plays Colonel K and Ed Gaughan takes over as Baron Greenback. Armstrong's Pointless co-host Richard Osman appears in the series as Professor Strontium Jellyfishowitz. John Oliver voices the character Dr Augustus P Crumhorn III and Lena Headey voices the character Jeopardy Mouse, a character newly introduced into this series. This series aired on Netflix in the US. Kevin Eldon describes the animation style as 'much the same as the original'. The first episode aired on 28 September 2015.

Jazwares is the master toy partner, Penguin Books published a range of printed books, including story books, official guides, sticker books, novelty books, annuals and electronic titles and D.C. Thomson & Co. published a monthly magazine with comic strips, puzzles, fact files, poster and competitions.

Spin-off
 Count Duckula (1988–1993)

Notes
 "Sx Ep. y" is shortened form for series x and episode y in the original Danger Mouse TV series

References

External links

 
 
 Danger Mouse appears on cover of Computer and Video Games magazine - September 1984.

1981 British television series debuts
1992 British television series endings
1980s British animated television series
1980s British children's television series
1990s British animated television series
1990s British children's television series
1980s Nickelodeon original programming
1990s Nickelodeon original programming
British children's animated adventure television series
British children's animated comic science fiction television series
British children's animated superhero television series
English-language television shows
Espionage television series
ITV children's television shows
Nickelodeon original programming
Parody superheroes
Fictional secret agents and spies
Danger Mouse
Television series by FremantleMedia Kids & Family
Television shows produced by Thames Television
Television series by Cosgrove Hall Films
Animated television series about mice and rats
Mass media franchises introduced in 1981
Television shows adapted into comics
Television shows adapted into video games
Television shows set in London
Comedy franchises